The 1980 California Angels season involved the Angels finishing 6th in the American League West with a record of 65 wins and 95 losses.

Offseason 
 November 16, 1979: Bruce Kison was signed as a free agent by the Angels.
 December 6, 1979:  The Angels traded Willie Aikens and Rance Mulliniks to the Kansas City Royals, in exchange for Al Cowens, Todd Cruz, and a player to be named later.
 January 11, 1980: Kevin Romine was drafted by the Angels in the 3rd round of the 1980 Major League Baseball draft, but did not sign.
 March 30, 1980: Danny Boone was released by the Angels.
 April 1, 1980:  The Angels received Craig Eaton from the Royals, completing the trade of December 6.

Regular season

Season standings

Record vs. opponents

Opening Day starters
Don Baylor
Rod Carew
Al Cowens
Brian Downing
Dan Ford
Dave Frost
Bobby Grich
Carney Lansford
Freddie Patek
Joe Rudi

Notable transactions 
 May 13, 1980: Dave Skaggs was purchased by the Angels from the Baltimore Orioles.
 May 27, 1980: Al Cowens was traded by the Angels to the Detroit Tigers in exchange for Jason Thompson
 June 3, 1980: Bill Mooneyham was drafted by the Angels in the 1st round (10th pick) of the secondary phase of the 1980 Major League Baseball draft.
 June 12, 1980: Todd Cruz was traded by the Angels to the Chicago White Sox in exchange for Randy Scarbery.
 June 24, 1980: Merv Rettenmund was released by the Angels.

Roster

Player stats

Batting

Starters by position 
Note: Pos = Position; G = Games played; AB = At bats; H = Hits; Avg. = Batting average; HR = Home runs; RBI = Runs batted in

Other batters 
Note: G = Games played; AB = At bats; H = Hits; Avg. = Batting average; HR = Home runs; RBI = Runs batted in

Pitching

Starting pitchers 
Note: G = Games pitched; IP = Innings pitched; W = Wins; L = Losses; ERA = Earned run average; SO = Strikeouts

Other pitchers 
Note: G = Games pitched; IP = Innings pitched; W = Wins; L = Losses; ERA = Earned run average; SO = Strikeouts

Relief pitchers 
Note: G = Games pitched; W = Wins; L = Losses; SV = Saves; ERA = Earned run average; SO = Strikeouts

Farm system

Notes

References 

1980 California Angels team at Baseball Reference
1980 California Angels  at Baseball Almanac

Los Angeles Angels seasons
California Angels season
Los